Bogoljub Kujundžić (1887 in Livno, Austria-Hungary – 1949 in Kitzbühel, Austria)  was a Serbian politician before and during World War II.

Kujundžić was born to a wealthy Serbian merchant family in Livno (present day Bosnia-Herzegovina), and educated in Karlowitz before going off to study law in Zagreb and Vienna. While studying in Vienna, he was Secretary of the "Zora Society," which was an organization for Serbian students. During World War I he fought for Serbian Kingdom and was wounded. After the First World War, he was active in politics, being first assigned to the Yugoslav embassy in Rome, then being appointed to Minister of Forests and Mines in 1925, before becoming Minister of Education. He left to Austria at the end of the war, where he died in 1949.

Sources
Novi prosvetni minister g. Bogoljub Kujundžić (in Slovenian)
Serbian Wikipedia

Serbian politicians
Serbian collaborators with Nazi Germany
Serbian military personnel of World War I
Serbian people of World War II
1887 births
1949 deaths
Serbs of Bosnia and Herzegovina
Royal Serbian Army soldiers
Austro-Hungarian emigrants to Serbia
People of the Kingdom of Yugoslavia
Bans of the Kingdom of Yugoslavia
People from Livno